Greg Flanegan (born 18 December 1958) is  a former Australian rules footballer who played with Essendon in the Victorian Football League (VFL).

Notes

External links 
		
Greg Flanegan's profile at Essendonfc.com

Living people
1958 births
Australian rules footballers from South Australia
Essendon Football Club players
Norwood Football Club players